This is a list of butterflies of the Gambia. About 173 species are known from Gambia none of which are thought to be endemic.

Papilionidae

Papilioninae

Papilionini
Papilio nireus Linnaeus, 1758
Papilio demodocus Esper, [1798]
Papilio hesperus Westwood, 1843

Leptocercini
Graphium angolanus baronis (Ungemach, 1932)
Graphium leonidas (Fabricius, 1793)

Pieridae

Coliadinae
Eurema brigitta (Stoll, [1780])
Eurema hapale (Mabille, 1882)
Eurema hecabe solifera (Butler, 1875)
Catopsilia florella (Fabricius, 1775)

Pierinae
Colotis amata calais (Cramer, 1775)
Colotis antevippe (Boisduval, 1836)
Colotis aurora evarne (Klug, 1829)
Colotis danae eupompe (Klug, 1829)
Colotis euippe (Linnaeus, 1758)
Colotis evagore antigone (Boisduval, 1836)
Colotis ione (Godart, 1819)
Colotis vesta amelia (Lucas, 1852)
Colotis eris (Klug, 1829)
Pinacopterix eriphia tritogenia (Klug, 1829)
Nepheronia argia (Fabricius, 1775)
Nepheronia thalassina (Boisduval, 1836)
Leptosia alcesta (Stoll, [1782])

Pierini
Appias epaphia (Cramer, [1779])
Appias sylvia (Fabricius, 1775)
Pontia glauconome Klug, 1829
Mylothris chloris (Fabricius, 1775)
Dixeia orbona (Geyer, [1837])
Belenois aurota (Fabricius, 1793)
Belenois calypso (Drury, 1773)
Belenois creona (Cramer, [1776])
Belenois gidica (Godart, 1819)

Lycaenidae

Miletinae

Miletini
Spalgis lemolea lemolea Druce, 1890
Spalgis lemolea pilos Druce, 1890
Lachnocnema emperamus (Snellen, 1872)

Poritiinae
Cephetola subcoerulea (Roche, 1954)

Aphnaeinae
Cigaritis buchanani (Rothschild, 1921)
Cigaritis mozambica (Bertoloni, 1850)
Cigaritis nilus (Hewitson, 1865)
Axiocerses harpax (Fabricius, 1775)
Aphnaeus orcas (Drury, 1782)

Theclinae
Myrina silenus (Fabricius, 1775)
Dapidodigma hymen (Fabricius, 1775)

Theclini
Hypolycaena condamini Stempffer, 1956
Hypolycaena philippus (Fabricius, 1793)
Iolaus iasis Hewitson, 1865
Iolaus menas Druce, 1890
Iolaus lukabas Druce, 1890
Iolaus calisto (Westwood, 1851)
Pilodeudorix caerulea (Druce, 1890)
Pilodeudorix diyllus occidentalis Libert, 2004
Deudorix antalus (Hopffer, 1855)
Deudorix dinochares Grose-Smith, 1887
Deudorix livia (Klug, 1834)
Deudorix lorisona abriana Libert, 2004

Polyommatinae

Lycaenesthini
Anthene amarah (Guérin-Méneville, 1849)
Anthene crawshayi (Butler, 1899)
Anthene larydas (Cramer, 1780)
Anthene lunulata (Trimen, 1894)
Anthene nigeriae (Aurivillius, 1905)

Polyommatini
Pseudonacaduba sichela (Wallengren, 1857)
Lampides boeticus (Linnaeus, 1767)
Cacyreus lingeus (Stoll, 1782)
Leptotes babaulti (Stempffer, 1935)
Leptotes pirithous (Linnaeus, 1767)
Tuxentius cretosus nodieri (Oberthür, 1883)
Tarucus rosacea (Austaut, 1885)
Tarucus theophrastus (Fabricius, 1793)
Tarucus ungemachi Stempffer, 1942
Zizeeria knysna (Trimen, 1862)
Zizina antanossa (Mabille, 1877)
Zizula hylax (Fabricius, 1775)
Azanus jesous (Guérin-Méneville, 1849)
Azanus moriqua (Wallengren, 1857)
Eicochrysops hippocrates (Fabricius, 1793)
Euchrysops malathana (Boisduval, 1833)
Euchrysops nilotica (Aurivillius, 1904)
Euchrysops osiris (Hopffer, 1855)
Chilades eleusis (Demaison, 1888)
Freyeria trochylus (Freyer, [1843])
Lepidochrysops synchrematiza (Bethune-Baker, [1923])

Nymphalidae

Danainae

Danaini
Danaus chrysippus alcippus (Cramer, 1777)
Amauris damocles (Fabricius, 1793)

Satyrinae

Melanitini
Melanitis leda (Linnaeus, 1758)
Melanitis libya Distant, 1882

Satyrini
Bicyclus angulosa (Butler, 1868)
Bicyclus funebris (Guérin-Méneville, 1844)
Bicyclus milyas (Hewitson, 1864)
Bicyclus pavonis (Butler, 1876)
Bicyclus sandace (Hewitson, 1877)
Bicyclus vulgaris (Butler, 1868)
Bicyclus zinebi (Butler, 1869)
Ypthima asterope (Klug, 1832)
Ypthima condamini nigeriae Kielland, 1982
Ypthima vuattouxi Kielland, 1982
Ypthimomorpha itonia (Hewitson, 1865)

Charaxinae

Charaxini
Charaxes varanes vologeses (Mabille, 1876)
Charaxes candiope (Godart, 1824)
Charaxes protoclea Feisthamel, 1850
Charaxes boueti Feisthamel, 1850
Charaxes cynthia Butler, 1866
Charaxes jasius Poulton, 1926
Charaxes epijasius Reiche, 1850
Charaxes castor (Cramer, 1775)
Charaxes achaemenes atlantica van Someren, 1970
Charaxes viola Butler, 1866

Nymphalinae

Nymphalini
Vanessa cardui (Linnaeus, 1758)
Junonia chorimene (Guérin-Méneville, 1844)
Junonia hierta cebrene Trimen, 1870
Junonia oenone (Linnaeus, 1758)
Junonia orithya madagascariensis Guenée, 1865
Junonia sophia (Fabricius, 1793)
Junonia terea (Drury, 1773)
Precis antilope (Feisthamel, 1850)
Hypolimnas anthedon (Doubleday, 1845)
Hypolimnas misippus (Linnaeus, 1764)
Catacroptera cloanthe ligata Rothschild & Jordan, 1903

Biblidinae

Biblidini
Byblia anvatara crameri Aurivillius, 1894

Limenitinae

Neptidini
Neptis serena Overlaet, 1955

Adoliadini
Hamanumida daedalus (Fabricius, 1775)
Aterica galene (Brown, 1776)
Bebearia senegalensis (Herrich-Schaeffer, 1858)
Euphaedra medon pholus (van der Hoeven, 1840)
Euphaedra ceres (Fabricius, 1775)

Heliconiinae

Acraeini
Acraea camaena (Drury, 1773)
Acraea neobule Doubleday, 1847
Acraea quirina (Fabricius, 1781)
Acraea zetes (Linnaeus, 1758)
Acraea egina (Cramer, 1775)
Acraea caecilia (Fabricius, 1781)
Acraea pseudegina Westwood, 1852
Acraea umbra carpenteri (Le Doux, 1937)
Acraea bonasia (Fabricius, 1775)
Acraea encedana Pierre, 1976
Acraea encedon (Linnaeus, 1758)
Acraea serena (Fabricius, 1775)

Vagrantini
Phalanta phalantha aethiopica (Rothschild & Jordan, 1903)

Hesperiidae

Coeliadinae
Coeliades aeschylus (Plötz, 1884)
Coeliades chalybe (Westwood, 1852)
Coeliades forestan (Stoll, [1782])

Pyrginae

Celaenorrhinini
Sarangesa laelius (Mabille, 1877)
Sarangesa phidyle (Walker, 1870)
Sarangesa tricerata (Mabille, 1891)

Tagiadini
Tagiades flesus (Fabricius, 1781)
Abantis nigeriana Butler, 1901

Carcharodini
Spialia diomus (Hopffer, 1855)
Spialia dromus (Plötz, 1884)
Spialia spio (Linnaeus, 1764)
Gomalia elma (Trimen, 1862)

Hesperiinae

Aeromachini
Astictopterus abjecta (Snellen, 1872)
Prosopalpus styla Evans, 1937
Parosmodes morantii axis Evans, 1937
Acleros ploetzi Mabille, 1890
Andronymus neander (Plötz, 1884)
Zophopetes cerymica (Hewitson, 1867)
Zophopetes quaternata (Mabille, 1876)
Gretna waga (Plötz, 1886)
Platylesches affinissima Strand, 1921
Platylesches batangae (Holland, 1894)
Platylesches galesa (Hewitson, 1877)
Platylesches moritili (Wallengren, 1857)
Platylesches picanini (Holland, 1894)

Baorini
Pelopidas mathias (Fabricius, 1798)
Borbo borbonica (Boisduval, 1833)
Borbo fallax (Gaede, 1916)
Borbo fanta (Evans, 1937)
Borbo fatuellus (Hopffer, 1855)
Borbo gemella (Mabille, 1884)
Borbo micans (Holland, 1896)
Borbo perobscura (Druce, 1912)
Parnara monasi (Trimen & Bowker, 1889)
Gegenes hottentota (Latreille, 1824)
Gegenes niso brevicornis (Plötz, 1884)
Gegenes pumilio gambica (Mabille, 1878)

See also
List of moths of the Gambia
Wildlife of the Gambia
Geography of the Gambia
Guinean forest-savanna mosaic

References

Seitz, A. Die Gross-Schmetterlinge der Erde 13: Die Afrikanischen Tagfalter. Plates
Seitz, A. Die Gross-Schmetterlinge der Erde 13: Die Afrikanischen Tagfalter. Text 

Gambia

Gambia
Gambia
Butterflies
Butterflies